Sherni may refer to:
 Sherni (1988 film)
 Sherni (2021 film)